Adap Galo Maringá Futebol Clube, usually known as ADAP Galo, was a Brazilian football club from Maringá, Paraná state. The club competed in the Brazilian Championship Third Division in 2007, but currently it is inactivated.

History
On 25 November 2006, two Paraná state clubs, ADAP, of Campo Mourão city, and Galo Maringá, of Maringá city, fused, and the new club was named Adap Galo Maringá Football Club. The club kept the same colors and kits of Galo Maringá, but the official club's foundation date was ADAP's one, 1999. Adap Galo Maringá's logo is similar to Galo Maringá's, but including the words "ADAP" and "1999" and at the same time keeping the name "Galo Maringá".

On 14 January 2007, Adap Galo Maringá played its first official match, against Nacional of Rolândia, at Willie Davids Stadium, Maringá and won 3–1. This was also the club's first Campeonato Paranaense match. In the same year, the club competed in the Brazilian Championship Third Division, but was eliminated in the first stage. In 2009 the club sent a letter to the Federation Paranaense quitting football competition since then the club is not activated.

Stadium
Adap Galo Maringá's home stadium was Willie Davids stadium, inaugurated in 1957, with a maximum capacity of 23,000 people.

The club also owned a training ground, in Campo Mourão.

Club colors
Adap Galo's colors were black and white, which were the colors of Galo Maringá.

References

External links
 ADAP's official website
 Galo Maringá's official website

 
Association football clubs established in 2006
Football clubs in Paraná (state)
2006 establishments in Brazil
Defunct football clubs in Paraná (state)